Ergo was an Indian daily newspaper which was published during 2007–2009 by Kasturi & Sons, the publishers of the newspaper The Hindu. It was published in tabloid format and distributed free of cost to Information Technology professionals in the software corridor of Chennai. At its peak, it had a circulation of 55,000 and a readership of 100,000. It ceased publication from 1 August 2009 and is currently available only online.

References

 The Hindu to launch IT tabloid in Chennai
 Ergo Launched

External links
 Official Website

English-language newspapers published in India
Mass media in Tamil Nadu
The Hindu Group
2007 establishments in Tamil Nadu
Publications established in 2007
2009 disestablishments in India
Publications disestablished in 2009